James Donald Wallace (May 21, 1937 – July 7, 2019) was an American philosopher. He was a professor of philosophy at the University of Illinois Urbana-Champaign for 49 years.

Biography
Wallace was born in Troy, New York on May 21, 1937.

He wrote several books on morality and ethics that draw on the American philosophical tradition of pragmatism, in particular the ethical theory of John Dewey. His works include Norms and Practices (2008), Ethical Norms, Particular Cases (1996), Moral Relevance and Moral Conflict (1988), Virtues and Vices (1978), and numerous articles.

Wallace taught a variety of subjects, including value theory, practical reasoning, social and political philosophy, bioethics, ancient Greek philosophy, and philosophy of art.

Wallace was the father of the novelist David Foster Wallace. He was an atheist.

Wallace died on July 7, 2019 in Tempe, Arizona, where he had lived since 2012.

Education
Wallace graduated with a BA from Amherst College in 1959 and a PhD from Cornell University in 1963.

See also
 List of American philosophers
 Pragmatic ethics

Notes

External links
List of published papers on PhilPapers
Books by James D. Wallace at the Internet Archive
Review of Norms and Practices by Daniel Groll of Carleton College
Author Meets Critics: Mike Martin's "Meaningful Work" – audio clips of James D. Wallace and others responding to the work of Mike W. Martin at a 2001 conference

1937 births
2019 deaths
American ethicists
People from Troy, New York
Amherst College alumni
Cornell University alumni
University of Illinois Urbana-Champaign faculty
American atheists